Saint-Viateur or variant may refer to:
 Saint Viateur, or Viator of Lyons
 the Viatorian order, Clercs Saint Viateur or Clerics of Saint Viator
 Saint-Cuthbert, Quebec
 Clercs-Saint-Viateur, Quebec
 Saint-Viateur d'Outremont Church, in Montreal
 St-Viateur Bagel, in Montreal
 St. Viateur's Academy, in Illinois